Andrew Harry Teague (born 5 February 1986) is an English professional footballer who plays for Lancaster City as a central defender.

Career
Born in Preston, Teague began his career with Macclesfield Town. He suffered a broken leg on 25 November 2006, after colliding with teammate Jonny Brain (who also broke his leg) in a game against Stockport County and was ruled out for the rest of the season.

He spent loan spells with Tamworth and Hyde United, before he was released by Macclefield in the summer of 2008.

He spent some time with Leigh Genesis, before moving to Lancaster City in January 2009, where he became club captain. He moved to Chorley in January 2011, making 390 appearances for the club, also becoming club captain. He returned to Lancaster City in June 2020.

References

External links 

1986 births
Living people
English footballers
Footballers from Preston, Lancashire
Macclesfield Town F.C. players
Tamworth F.C. players
Hyde United F.C. players
Leigh Genesis F.C. players
Lancaster City F.C. players
Chorley F.C. players
English Football League players
National League (English football) players
Association football defenders